G. Muthuraj (1 July 1927 – 21 May 2006) was a football player from Karnataka, India.

Footballing career
Fondly known as Muthu, Muthuraj started his career as a defender with the Bangalore Mars in 1947. He also became the captain of the Karnataka state team and played for his state for nearly a decade. he made his international debut in an away series in 1953 against Myanmar (then called Burma).

He represented India at the 1954 Asian Games in Manila.

Professional career
Muthu joined the 515 Army Base Workshop in 1950 and retired in 1962. From then on, he coached the Army team until he quit in 1990.

Personal life
Muthuraj is survived by two sons, both of whom were footballers, and three daughters.

Honours

India
Colombo Cup: 1953

References

Footballer Muthuraj no more; Times News Network; The Times of India; pg 22; Monday, 22 May 2006.

1927 births
2006 deaths
Place of death missing
Indian footballers
India international footballers
Footballers from Bangalore
Association football defenders